
Gmina Żelechlinek is a rural gmina (administrative district) in Tomaszów Mazowiecki County, Łódź Voivodeship, in central Poland.

Villages
Gmina Żelechlinek contains the villages and settlements of Brenik, Budki Łochowskie, Bukowiec, Chociszew, Czechowice, Czerwonka, Dzielnica, Feliksów, Gawerków, Gutkowice, Gutkowice-Nowiny, Ignatów, Janów, Józefin, Julianów, Karolinów, Kopiec, Lesisko, Łochów Nowy, Łochów Stary, Lucjanów, Modrzewek, Naropna, Nowe Byliny, Nowiny, Petrynów, Radwanka, Sabinów, Sokołówka, Stanisławów, Staropole, Świniokierz Dworski, Świniokierz Włościański, Teklin, Władysławów, Wola Naropińska, Wolica, Żelechlin and Żelechlinek.

Neighbouring gminas
Gmina Żelechlinek is bordered by the gminas of Budziszewice, Czerniewice, Głuchów, Jeżów, Koluszki, Lubochnia and Rawa Mazowiecka.

References
 Polish official population figures 2006

Zelechlinek
Tomaszów Mazowiecki County